Puerto Rico Highway 142 (PR-142) is a north–south road that connects the northern region of Puerto Rico with the municipality of Corozal, extending from PR-2 in Dorado to PR-159 near downtown Corozal.

Route description
In Dorado, it is a divided highway with two lanes in both directions. Then it becomes a smaller road with areas where there are two lanes in one direction and one lane in the other direction (2+1 road). Between Toa Alta and Corozal, the road can be dangerous during the night and rainy days because the area is very dark and the fog formation is frequent, causing poor visibility to drivers.

The following barrios are directly served by Puerto Rico Highway 142:

 Espinosa, from PR-2 in Dorado to the Toa Alta municipal limit
 Río Lajas, from the Dorado municipal limit to the Corozal municipal limit
 Abras, from the Toa Alta municipal limit to the Pueblo line
 Pueblo, from the Abras line to PR-159 in Corozal

Major intersections

See also

 List of highways numbered 142

References

External links
 

142